Pembeli (also: Penpeli) is a village in the Göynücek District, Amasya Province, Turkey. Its population is 76 (2021).

References

Villages in Göynücek District